German submarine U-965 was a Type VIIC U-boat of Nazi Germany's Kriegsmarine during World War II.

She was ordered on 5 June 1941, and was laid down on 4 May 1942 at Blohm & Voss, Hamburg, as yard number 165. She was launched on 14 January 1943 and commissioned under the command of Oberleutnant zur See Klaus Ohling on 25 February 1943.

Design
German Type VIIC submarines were preceded by the shorter Type VIIB submarines. U-965 had a displacement of  when at the surface and  while submerged. She had two shafts and two  propellers.

U-965 was fitted with five  torpedo tubes (four fitted at the bow and one at the stern), fourteen torpedoes or 26 TMA mines, one  SK C/35 naval gun, 220 rounds, and one twin  C/30 anti-aircraft gun. The boat had a complement of between 44 — 52 men.

Service history
U-965 had a recorded three attacks on her and one lost crewmember, but she actually came under four attacks, the fourth sinking her.

On 6 February 1944, one day after leaving Narvik, Leutnant zur See Gustav-Günther Schoop, the I.WO (1st Watch Officer), fell overboard and drowned.

On 17 May 1944, four days out of Bergen, U-965 developed serious technical problems and was forced to return to base. U-965 encountered an enemy submarine four hours after turning back for base. The enemy submarine fired a spread of torpedoes, which all missed.

U-965 was on her second war patrol when, at 13:05 hrs on 20 July 1944, she came under attack in the Norwegian Sea by a British B-24 Liberator of 59 Squadron/N RAF piloted by F/O D.A. Willows, after locating her on radar. The B-24 passed U-965 two miles astern trying to come in on a favorable approach on her starboard beam. As the Liberator approached U-965s 37mm AA gun jammed on the first round and the bomber was able to hit both men, with machine gun fire, manning the twin 20mm AA gun on the port side. However, the lock-select lever on the B-24 had not been fully engaged which caused the depth charges to not release over U-965s stern as intended. U-965 was then able to dive and escape the seven depth charges that the Liberator dropped about 40 seconds after she dived.  Returning 90 minutes later, the Liberator crew reported seeing two small oil streaks, an oval life raft and a couple of pieces of wood.  U-965 was undamaged and remained submerged and unseen until the bomber left.

On 22 August 1944, U-965 came under attack by two Fleet Air Arm Grumman F6F Hellcat, in Hammerfest. Eight crewmen were wounded with three crewmen killed.

All 51 of her crew were lost.

Wolfpacks
U-965 took part in nine wolfpacks, namely:
 Isegim (5 – 27 January 1944)
 Werewolf (27 January – 2 February 1944)
 Trutz (23 June – 10 July 1944)
 Schwefel (22 – 23 September 1944)
 Zorn (28 September – 1 October 1944)
 Grimm (1 – 2 October 1944)
 Panther (16 – 22 October 1944)
 Panther (24 October – 10 November 1944)
 Stier (25 November – 19 December 1944)

References

Bibliography

External links

German Type VIIC submarines
U-boats commissioned in 1943
World War II submarines of Germany
Ships built in Hamburg
1943 ships
Maritime incidents in March 1945
World War II shipwrecks in the Atlantic Ocean